Scott Nichol (born 18 June 1970) is a former Scotland international rugby union player. He played at Fly-half and Centre.

Rugby Union career

Amateur career

He played for Selkirk.

He later moved to play for Melrose.

He moved to Peebles where he was player-coach.

Provincial and professional career

He played for South of Scotland District in the Scottish Inter-District Championship.

When Scotland's districts turned into professional sides in 1995, Nichol then played for the Border Reivers. Outwith the appearances in the Scottish Inter-District Championship for the Reivers, he played 9 times for them in the Heineken Cup.

International career

He was capped by Scotland 'B' to play Ireland 'B' on 22 December 1990 and played in the Scotland 'B' side against France 'B' in the spring of 1991.

He played for Scotland 'A'. He received 9 'A' caps in total.

He received a full senior cap for Scotland against Argentina in 1994.

He played for Scotland 7s in the Hong Kong Sevens.

Coaching career

He was a player-coach at Peebles.

He was an assistant coach for Gala from 2010-2014.

References

1970 births
Living people
Selkirk RFC players
Rugby union fly-halves
Scotland 'A' international rugby union players
Scotland 'B' international rugby union players
Scotland international rugby union players
Scottish rugby union players
South of Scotland District (rugby union) players
Melrose RFC players
Peebles RFC players
Border Reivers players
Scotland international rugby sevens players